Euclasta montalbani is a moth in the family Crambidae. It was described by Popescu-Gorj and Constantinescu in 1977. It is found in the Philippines (Luzon).

References

Moths described in 1977
Pyraustinae